Dhalai Union is a union of Hathazari Upazila of Chittagong District.

Geography

Area of Dhalai: 4,870 acres (19.71 km2).

Location

North: Farhadabad Union

East: Halda River

South: Guman Mardan Union

West: Farhadabad Union

History
In 1974 The government declared that it is good village in terms of crimes in Bangladesh.

Population
As of 1991 Bangladesh census, Dhalai union has a population of 29,571 and house units 4872.

Education
 Katirhat High School 
 Katirhat Girl's High School
 katirhat  Woman's College
 West Dhalai High School
 Enayetpur High School
 Katirhat M. I. Fazil (degree) Madrasa
 Hadhurkhil Mohila Dhakil Madrasha

More than 8 primary schools and Kindergarten.

This union was declared 100% literate during 1997 by Govt. of Bangladesh.

Marketplaces and bazars
Katirhat bazar, Hadurkhill, Monia Pokor, Noea Hat,

References

Unions of Hathazari Upazila